Mary Busingye Karooro Okurut (born 8 December 1954), more commonly known as Mary Karooro Okurut, is a Ugandan educator, author and politician. She is the former Cabinet Minister in Charge of General Duties in the Office of the Prime Minister, in the Ugandan Cabinet. She was appointed to that position on 6 June 2016. Prior to that, from 1 March 2015 until 6 June 2016, she served as Cabinet Minister for National Security. She was appointed to that position on 1 March 2015, replacing Wilson Muruli Mukasa, who was appointed Minister of Gender and Social Issues. Between 2012 and 2015, she served as the Minister of Gender and Social Issues in the Cabinet of Uganda. She was appointed to that position in 2012. She replaced Syda Bumba, who resigned from Cabinet. Mary Karoro Okurut also serves as the elected Member of Parliament for Bushenyi District Women's Constituency. In the 2020 National resistance movement NRM party flag bearer elections, Karooro lost to Annet Katusiime Mugisha who was elected Bushenyi district woman member of parliament in the 2021 Uganda presidential and parliamentary elections.

Background and education
She was born in Bushenyi District on 8 December 1954. She attended Bweranyangi Primary School and Bweranyangi Girls' Senior Secondary School for her elementary and middle school education, in that order. In 1972, at the age of 18, she entered Trinity College Nabbingo to carry out her high school education. In 1974, she entered Makerere University, graduating in 1977 with the degree of Bachelor of Arts in Literature (BA.Lit). Three years later, in 1981, she graduated with the degree of Master of Arts in Literature (MA.Lit), also from Makerere University. In 1982, she added the Diploma in Education (Dip.Ed), from the same university.

Work history
Mary Karooro Okurut began lecturing at Makerere, in the Department of Literature in 1981, as soon as she completed her Master's degree. She maintained her status as Lecturer, until 1993. She took up employment as the press secretary to the Vice-President of Uganda from 1994 until 1996. Between 1996 and 1999 she served as Commissioner, Education Service Commission in the Ugandan Ministry of Education. From 1999 until 2004, she served as the press secretary of the President of Uganda. In 2004 she entered elective Ugandan politics. She is currently serving as the woman member of parliament.

Literary work
Prior to her political career, Okurut was perhaps best known for her contributions to Ugandan literature both as a writer and as the founder of the Uganda Women Writers Association (FEMRITE), an organisation which has since received international attention and has to date produced one winner of the Caine Prize, Arach Monica de Nyeko, whose story "Jambula Tree" won in 2007.

Karooro Okurut's literary publications include these novels: (a) "The Invisible Weevil" (1998) and (b) "The Official Wife". She also edited "A Woman's Voice"  (1998), a collection of short stories by Ugandan women writers.

Political career
In 2004, Mary Karooro Okurut contested for the Bushenyi District Women's Constituency on the National Resistance Movement political party ticket. She won and has represented that constituency in the Parliament of Uganda until today. She served as Minister of Information and National Guidance from May 2011 until May 2013, when she was reassigned to her current docket. In a cabinet reshuffle on 1 March 2015, she was appointed Security Minister. As of April 2020, karoro okurut is the minister for general duties in the office of the prime minister

Personal details
Mary K. Okurut was married to Hon. Stanislaus Okurut until his death on the morning of 5 April 2014; together they had eight children – five boys and three girls. She is of the Protestant faith.

See also
Cabinet of Uganda
Parliament of Uganda
Bushenyi District
FEMRITE

References

External links
 Full List of Ugandan Cabinet Ministers May 2011

1954 births
Living people
Government ministers of Uganda
Members of the Parliament of Uganda
National Resistance Movement politicians
People from Bushenyi District
Ugandan women writers
Makerere University alumni
21st-century Ugandan women politicians
21st-century Ugandan politicians
Women government ministers of Uganda
Women members of the Parliament of Uganda
People educated at Trinity College Nabbingo
People educated at Bweranyangi Girls' Senior Secondary School